Herbert Harold Powell (23 November 1885 – 28 September 1957) was an English professional footballer who played in the Football League for Chesterfield Town, Barnsley and Birmingham. He played as a forward.

Career
Powell was born in Maidstone, Kent. He was on the books of Nottingham Forest, though never played for the league side, and played for Gresley Rovers and Grantham Avenue before making his first appearance in the Football League, for Chesterfield Town in the Second Division in the 1906–07 season. A few months later he appeared for Barnsley, also in the Second Division, then spent time at Carlisle United, New Brompton and Coventry City, surfacing for a third time in the Second Division with Birmingham in 1910. He scored on his Birmingham debut, but soon left for a tour of senior non-league football either side of the First World War, finishing off his career with Sutton Town in 1923.

References

Footballers from Nottingham
English footballers
Association football forwards
Treharris Athletic Western F.C. players
Nottingham Forest F.C. players
Gresley F.C. players
Grantham Avenue F.C. players
Chesterfield F.C. players
Barnsley F.C. players
Carlisle United F.C. players
Gillingham F.C. players
Coventry City F.C. players
Birmingham City F.C. players
Rotherham Town F.C. (1899) players
Portsmouth F.C. players
AFC Bournemouth players
Worksop Town F.C. players
Grantham Town F.C. players
Retford Town F.C. players
Ashfield United F.C. players
English Football League players
Brentford F.C. wartime guest players
1885 births
1957 deaths
People from Colwick
Footballers from Nottinghamshire